Byflaten or Veldre is a village in Ringsaker Municipality in Innlandet county, Norway. Veldre Church is located on the west side of the village.

The area surrounding the village is known as Veldre. The area is highly productive farmland and pine forests. The higher points in Veldre offer a splendid view over the Hedemarken district and southern parts of the lake Mjøsa.

Notable people
Johan Nordhagen (1856–1956) was a well-known graphic artist born in Veldre. His graphic prints are mostly motives from Veldre.

One can debate whether Alf Prøysen came from Veldre, or the neighboring Rudshøgda, but his ties to the district were deeply rooted. His motives grew out of his working-class peasant childhood. His folk tunes are some of the most important contributions to the national heritage.

Guttorm P. Haugen, poet and writer, described the wilderness of the large forests, and the value of natural living, as opposed to life in the city.

References

Ringsaker
Villages in Innlandet